STIII may refer to:

 Star Trek III: The Search for Spock (1984 film) third film in the original Star Trek film series
 Star Trek Beyond (2016 film) third film in the J.J.Abrams reboot Star Trek film series
 Starship Troopers 3: Marauder (2008 film) third film in the Starship Troopers film series
 Star Trek III Combat Simulator (1984 game) FASA tabletop board wargame, see Star Trek: Starship Tactical Combat Simulator

See also
 ST3 (disambiguation)